The 1800 Massachusetts gubernatorial election was held on April 7.

Federalist Caleb Strong was elected over Democratic-Republican Elbridge Gerry.

Lieutenant Governor Moses Gill, who had been acting as Governor since the June 7 death of Increase Sumner, preferred to run for re-election to that position, and he won re-election in a concurrent election. However, he received a significant number of votes for Governor as well.

Acting Governor Gill actually died before the 1801 term began, leaving the Governor's Council to conduct gubernatorial duties until Strong's term started.

General election

Results

References 

Governor
1800
Massachusetts
April 1800 events